Niaz Mohammad Stadium (also known as Brahmanbaria District Stadium) is a multi-purpose stadium in Brahmanbaria, Bangladesh. It is primarily used for football and cricket, as well as holiday events.

See also
Stadiums in Bangladesh
List of football stadiums in Bangladesh
List of cricket grounds in Bangladesh

References

Cricket grounds in Bangladesh
Football venues in Bangladesh